Bushrod Washington Price House, also known as the Price-Burley House, is a historic home located at Moundsville, Marshall County, West Virginia. It was built about 1830, and is a five bay, "L"-shaped brick dwelling in a Greek Revival / I-house style.

It was listed on the National Register of Historic Places in 1995.

References

Houses on the National Register of Historic Places in West Virginia
Greek Revival houses in West Virginia
Houses completed in 1830
Houses in Marshall County, West Virginia
National Register of Historic Places in Marshall County, West Virginia
I-houses in West Virginia
1830 establishments in Virginia
Moundsville, West Virginia